The 2006–07 LNAH season was the 11th season of the Ligue Nord-Américaine de Hockey (before 2004 the Quebec Semi-Pro Hockey League), a minor professional league in the Canadian province of Quebec. Eight teams participated in the regular season, and the Summum-Chiefs de Saint-Jean-Sur-Riechelieu won the league title.

Regular season

Coupe Futura-Playoffs 
Won by Summum-Chiefs de Saint-Jean-sur-Richelieu.

External links 
 Statistics on hockeydb.com

Ligue Nord-Américaine de Hockey seasons
3